John C. Priscu (born 20 September 1952, Las Vegas, Nevada), is a Romanian-American scientist who is the current Professor of Ecology in the Department of Land Resources and Environmental Sciences at Montana State University. He is a principal investigator in the McMurdo Dry Valleys Long Term Ecological Research (LTER) project.

Filmography/TV appearances
He appeared on documentary program Horizon in the episode "The Lost World of Lake Vostok".

References

External links
John Charles Priscu Montana State University

See also
 Jill Mikucki

American people of Romanian descent
1952 births
Living people
People from Las Vegas
American Antarctic scientists
Romanian scientists
American scientists